Cross-country skiing at the 2015 European Youth Olympic Winter Festival was held at the Steg in Liechtenstein from 26 to 30 January 2015.

Results

Medal table

Boys events

Girls events

Mixed events

References 

2015 European Youth Olympic Winter Festival
2015 in cross-country skiing
2015